Dinajpur Polytechnic Institute located in Dinajpur, Bangladesh is a largest and reputed Government polytechnic institute in Bangladesh which was established in 1964. This polytechnic has controlled by the Government of Bangladesh and under the Bangladesh Technical Education Board (BTEB).

History
It was established in 1964 by the then East Pakistan government. This polytechnic was the first voyage that began in 1964 with only Civil and Power Technology. After 4 years Mechanical technology has been added to this college. And later gradually the other departments like Computer technology and Architecture And Interior Design have added. Presently this polytechnic has a total of 6 Departments.

Directorates 
The institute operates under the executive control of the Ministry of Education acting through the Directorate of Technical Education Bangladesh. The academic programs and curricula are maintained under the regulation of the Bangladesh Technical Education Board (BTEB). BTEB functions under the Directorate of Inspection and Audit, which in turn functions under Chief Accounts Office.

Admission
The minimum requirement for admission is Secondary School Certificate (SSC) or equivalent certificate with at least CGPA 3.50 (65% marks) in average with minimum of GPA 3.50 in mathematics.

All the government polytechnic has been preserved some quotas. Also, the Dinajpur Polytechnic has preserved some quotas among them some are the female quota about 20%, SSC (vocational) 15%, minor ethnic group quota 2%, freedom fighter 5%, special needs student quota 5%, and 2% for children of officials or employees who are working in Ministry of Expatriates’ Welfare and Overseas Employment.

Academic departments 
Academic activities are undertaken by six departments-

Course and grading system 
Each of the Dinajpur polytechnic institute's departments is divided into eight semesters. In each semester a student earns a significant amount of CGPA under 4. The last semester is the Industrial Training Semester. A student learns practical information about a selected technology in the industry for about six months.

Academic courses are based on a credit system.

Campus 
 
The campus consists of below infrastructure & facilities-

 Administrative building 
 Academic Building 
 Workshop, Lab 
 Students residential hostel
 Mosque
 Playground
 Library 
 Canteen 
 Auditorium
 Student Parliament

Students residences or hostels 
Dinajpur Polytechnic Institute have two hostel for male and one hostel for female students.

Student organizations 

 Rover Scout Group
 Sports Association
 Students Parliament

See also

 Bogra Polytechnic Institute
 Bhola Polytechnic Institute
 Chandpur Polytechnic Institute
 Chittagong Polytechnic Institute
 Dhaka Polytechnic Institute
 Faridpur Polytechnic Institute
 Feni Polytechnic Institute
 Habiganj Polytechnic Institute
 Jessore Polytechnic Institute
 Khulna Polytechnic Institute
 Rajshahi Polytechnic Institute
 Rangpur Polytechnic Institute
 BCI Engineering Institute

References 

Colleges in Dinajpur District
Educational institutions established in 1964
1964 establishments in East Pakistan
Polytechnic institutes in Bangladesh